The Prix Valery Larbaud is a French literary prize created in 1967, ten years after writer Valery Larbaud's death, by L'Association Internationale des Amis de Valery Larbaud, an organization dedicated to the promotion of his works. The prize is awarded to writers of books the jurists feel "that Larbaud would have loved".
It is always awarded in Vichy on the last weekend in May.

Prize winners
Winners:
 1967 – Michel Dard, Mélusine
 1968 – Robert Levesque, Les Bains d'Estramadure
 1969 – Claude Roy, Le verbe Aimer et autres essais
 1970 – Henri Thomas, La Relique
 1971 – Guy Rohou, Le Bateau des Iles
 1972 – J.M.G. Le Clézio and Frida Weissman for all their works
 1973 – Georges Perros, Papiers collés I, II
 1974 – Pierre Leyris, for translations of William Blake's works
 1975 – Muriel Cerf, Le Diable vert
 1976 – Marcel Thiry, Toi qui pâlis au nom de Vancouver
 1977 – Jean Blot, Les Cosmopolites and Françoise Lioure
 1978 – Philippe Jaccottet for all his works
 1979 – Georges Piroué, Feux et lieux
 1980 – Paule Constant, Ouregano
 1981 – Noël Devaulx for all his works
 1982 – Christian Giudicelli, Une affaire de famille
 1983 – Jacques Réda for all his works
 1984 – Hubert Nyssen for all his works
 1985 – Jean Lescure and Bernard Delvaille
 1986 – René de Ceccatty, L'Or et la Poussière
 1987 – Emmanuel Carrère, Le Détroit de Behring
 1988 – Jean-Marie Laclavetine, Donnafugata
 1989 – Jean Rolin, La ligne de front
 1990 – Frédéric Jacques Temple, Anthologie Personnelles
 1991 – Frédéric Vitoux, Sérénissime
 1992 – Nicolas Bréhal, Sonate au Clair de Lune
 1993 – Olivier Germain-Thomas, Au cœur de l'enfance
 1994 – Jean-Noël Pancrazi, Le Silence des Passions
 1995 – Alain Blottière, L'Enchantement
 1996 – François Bott, Radiguet
 1997 – Jean-Paul Enthoven, Les enfants de Saturne
 1998 – Gérard Macé, Colportage I et II
 1999 – Gilles Leroy, Machines à sous
 2000 – Guy Goffette, Partance et autres lieux
 2002 – Jean-Claude Pirotte, Ange Vincent
 2003 – Georges-Olivier Chateaureynaud, Au fond du Paradis
 2004 – Jean-Bertrand Pontalis, La Traversée des ombres 
 2005 – Christine Jordis, Une passion excentrique : visites anglaises 
 2006 – Pierre Jourde, Festins secrets 
 2007 – Vincent Delecroix, Ce qui est perdu
 2008 - Thomas B. Reverdy, Les derniers feux
 2009 - Éditions Michel Lafon, Une vie de Pierre Ménard
 2010 - Cloé Korman, Les Hommes-couleurs (Le Seuil)
 2011 - Jérôme Ferrari, Où j'ai laissé mon âme (Actes Sud) 
 2012 - Shumona Sinha, Assommons les pauvres! (L'Olivier)
 2013 - Éric Vuillard, Congo et La Bataille d'Occident (Actes Sud)
 2014 - Frédéric Verger, Gallimard
 2015 - Luba Jurgenson, Au lieu du péril, Verdier
 2016 - Hédi Kaddour, Gallimard.
 2017 – Jean-Baptiste Del Amo, Règne animal, Gallimard
 2018 – Maud Simonnot, La Nuit pour adresse, Gallimard
 2019 – Anton Beraber, La Grande Idée, Gallimard
 2020 – Jacques Drillon, Cadence, Gallimard

References 

Valery Larbaud
Awards established in 1967
1967 establishments in France